Save the Chimps, Inc is a publicly financed 501(c)(3)nonprofit American sanctuary specializing in the care of chimpanzees. The organization was founded by Carole C. Noon in 1997. Save the Chimps is accredited by the Global Federation of Animal Sanctuaries and a founding member of the North American Primate Sanctuary Alliance. The mission of Save the Chimps is to provide sanctuary and exemplary care to chimpanzees in need. 

The majority of the chimpanzees at Save the Chimps live in large social groups on three-acre islands located on 150 acres in a rural area of Fort Pierce, Florida. Save the Chimps is notable for rescuing 266 chimpanzees from the Coulston Foundation, a biomedical research facility that went bankrupt in 2002. The rescue of these chimpanzees was the single largest rescue of chimpanzees in history, and transformed Save the Chimps into the world's largest chimpanzee sanctuary.

References

Further reading

External links 
 

Animal charities based in the United States
Charities based in Florida
Organizations established in 1997
Primate sanctuaries